Jean-François Péron (born 11 October 1965 in Saint-Omer, France), more commonly known in England as Jeff Peron, is a retired French professional footballer who played as a midfielder for several teams in the Football League.

After finishing his playing career, Péron moved into coaching.

References

External links

Jeff Peron French careers stats at racingstub.com

1965 births
Living people
People from Saint-Omer
French footballers
French expatriate footballers
Expatriate footballers in England
Association football midfielders
RC Strasbourg Alsace players
RC Lens players
Stade Malherbe Caen players
Ayr United F.C. players
Walsall F.C. players
Portsmouth F.C. players
Wigan Athletic F.C. players
English Football League players
Scottish Football League players
Sportspeople from Pas-de-Calais
Footballers from Hauts-de-France
Expatriate footballers in Scotland
French expatriate sportspeople in England
French expatriate sportspeople in Scotland